Bautista Saavedra Mallea (30 August 1870 in Sorata – 1 May 1939) was a Bolivian lawyer and politician who served as the 29th president of Bolivia from 1921 to 1925. Prior to that, he was part of a governing junta from 1920 to 1921. 

As leader of the insurgent Republican Party, he instigated and led the coup d'état of 1920 against the long-ruling Liberal Party of President José Gutiérrez Guerra. He had a turbulent term, as his party fragmented almost immediately after the coup, with a large fraction of it going on to form the Partido Republicano-Genuino (Genuine Republican party). Essentially, the split was due to opposition to the largely personalist, centralized, and caudillo-like governing style of Saavedra. He quickly expelled from the country most top-leaders of the Genuino party, and often made use of extra-constitutional means to remain in power. 

Unable to run for re-election in 1925, Saavedra did the next best thing and made sure a hand-picked successor would follow him, presumably one firmly under his thumb. His first choice, Gabino Villanueva, failed to be sufficiently pliable for the President's liking, and Saavedra annulled the 1925 elections on a technicality. Nationwide protests at this transparent effort to manipulate the elections and prolong Saavedra's stay in office forced the President to resign, leaving in his place Felipe Segundo Guzmán, the President of the Senate. The latter, clearly a "Saavedra's man," called elections for 1926. 

Saavedra thus renewed his quest to find the ideal proxy candidate through which to rule. He found the perfect man in Hernando Siles, who ran in the elections along with Bautista Saavedra's own brother, Abdón Saavedra, as his Vice-Presidential running mate. This allowed the meddling former President to continue to run the strings of the Bolivian government. However, President Siles eventually, tired of Saavedra's heavy-handed meddling, exiled him along with his brother (his own Vice-President). 

Saavedra remained an influential political leader after that, but never returned to power, especially since his arch-rivals of the Partido Republicano Genuino finally gained power in 1930. He died while exiled in Chile on May 1, 1939.

The Bautista Saavedra Province was named after this former president. Its capital is Charazani.

References

Notes

Footnotes

External links
 

1870 births
1939 deaths
20th-century Bolivian lawyers
20th-century Bolivian politicians
Ambassadors of Bolivia to Belgium
Ambassadors of Bolivia to Switzerland
Ambassadors of Bolivia to the Netherlands
Bolivian diplomats
Bolivian expatriates in Chile
Bolivian journalists
Bolivian sociologists
Defense ministers of Bolivia
Education ministers of Bolivia
Government ministers of Bolivia
Higher University of San Andrés alumni
Justice ministers of Bolivia
Leaders who took power by coup
Liberal Party (Bolivia) politicians
Members of the Chamber of Deputies (Bolivia)
Members of the Senate of Bolivia
People from Larecaja Province
Presidents of Bolivia
Republican Party (Bolivia) politicians
Socialist Republican Party (Bolivia) politicians